Szewce  is a village in the administrative district of Gmina Wisznia Mała, within Trzebnica County, Lower Silesian Voivodeship, in south-western Poland. Prior to 1945 it was in Germany.

The village has an approximate population of 900.

References

Szewce